The women's 57 kg competition in at the 2021 African Judo Championships was held on 20 May at the Dakar Arena in Dakar, Senegal.

Results

Main Round

Repechage

References

External links
 

W57
Africa
African W57